The Patriots is a play written in a prologue and three acts by Sidney Kingsley in 1943. It won the New York Drama Critics' Circle award for Best Play, and ran for 173 performances.

Synopsis
Thomas Jefferson has just returned from France, hoping to relax with his daughters at Monticello. George Washington however, has a favor to ask of him. Hit by tough political opposition, specifically afraid of rising monarch strength, he urges Jefferson to become his Secretary of State. Jefferson accepts, albeit grudgingly. Not long after, he is battling his archrival, Alexander Hamilton, a Federalist just before his election in 1800.

Details
The show played at the National Theatre and was directed by Shepard Traube, produced by Playwrights' Company and Rowland Stebbins, music by Stanley Bate, scenic design by Howard Bay, costume design by Rose Bogdanoff and Toni Ward, and lighting design by Moe Hack.

The cast on opening night was:
Roland Alexander as Mr. Fenno
Leslie Bingham as Mrs. Conrad
Francis Compton as Colonel Humphrey
Thomas Dillon as Jacob
Madge Evans as Patsy
Doe Doe Green as Jupiter
Cecil Humphreys as	George Washington
House Jameson as Alexander Hamilton
Raymond Edward Johnson as Thomas Jefferson
Peg La Centra as Mrs. Hamilton
Judson Laire as James Monroe
Robert Lance as Butler
Hope Lange as Anne Randolph
Jack Lloyd as George Washington Lafayette
Ross Matthew as Doctor
George Mitchell as Ned
Henry Mowbray as Henry Knox
Billy Nevard as Thomas Jefferson Randolph
Frances Reid as Martha
Byron Russell as Captain
John Souther as James Madison
Victor Southwick as Sergeant
John Stephen as Frontiersman
Philip White as Mat

Adaptations

The play has been presented on television twice, by NBC in 1963 (starring Charlton Heston as Thomas Jefferson, John Fraser as Alexander Hamilton, and Howard St. John as George Washington) and in 1976 by PBS (starring Robert Murch as Thomas Jefferson, Philip LeStrange as Alexander Hamilton, and Ralph Clanton as George Washington), but it has never been made into a theatrical film.

Ironically, the first telecast, in 1963, took place on November 15, one week before the assassination of President John F. Kennedy.  The 1976 telecast is available on DVD.

References

1943 plays
New York Drama Critics' Circle Award winners
Plays by Sidney Kingsley
Plays set in Washington, D.C.
Fiction set in 1800
Cultural depictions of George Washington
Cultural depictions of Thomas Jefferson
Cultural depictions of James Monroe
Cultural depictions of Alexander Hamilton
Cultural depictions of James Madison
Plays set in Pennsylvania
Philadelphia in fiction
Plays based on real people